Cerconota machinatrix is a moth of the family Depressariidae. It is found in Colombia.

References

Moths described in 1925
Cerconota
Taxa named by Edward Meyrick